Darkness and Hope is the fifth studio album by Portuguese gothic metal band Moonspell, released in 2001.

Intro Sampler on "Rapaces" taken from Lifeforce.

Several different versions were released, with different bonus tracks. One version contained "Os Senhores da Guerra", originally by Madredeus, the second featured "Mr. Crowley", originally by Ozzy Osbourne. Another version had a cover of Joy Division's "Love Will Tear Us Apart" as the bonus track. The limited edition contained all three bonus tracks.

Artwork 
The cover of the album features the "Moonspell trident" designed by a Polish artist Wojciech Blasiak. The sign, later refined in The Antidotes artwork, became recognizable as a symbol of the band.

Track listing

Credits

Band members 
 Fernando Ribeiro – vocals
 Ricardo Amorim – guitars
 Sérgio Crestana – bass
 Pedro Paixão – keyboards
 Miguel Gaspar – drums

Additional personnel 
 Adolfo Luxúria Canibal – spoken word on "Than the Serpents in My Hands"
 Asta – female vocals on "Devilred"

Production 
 Wojtek Blasiak – artwork
 Paulo Moreira – photography, layout
 Mika Jussila – mastering
 Hiili Hiilesmaa – producer, mixing
 Adriano Esteves – layout

Charts

References 

2001 albums
Moonspell albums
Century Media Records albums